Gurudaspur Assembly constituency is a Punjab Legislative Assembly constituency in Gurdaspur district, Punjab state, India.

Members of Legislative Assembly

Election results

2022

2017

2012

2007

References

External links
  

Assembly constituencies of Punjab, India
Gurdaspur district